Vietteilus is a genus of moths in the family Pterophoridae.

Species
Vietteilus borbonica 	(Viette, 1957)
Vietteilus stenoptilioides Gibeaux, 1994
Vietteilus vigens (Felder, Rogenhofer, 1875)

Pterophorinae
Moth genera